Gong Maoxin and Yi Chu-huan were the defending champions but chose to participate with different partners. Gong partnered Zhang Ze and successfully defended his title. Yi partnered Ruan Roelofse but lost in the final to Gong and Zhang.

Gong and Zhang won the title after defeating Roelofse and Yi 6–3, 7–6(7–4) in the final.

Seeds

Draw

References
 Main Draw

Zhuhai Open - Men's Doubles
Zhuhai Open